Stop at Tenerife (Spanish:Escala en Tenerife) is a 1964 Spanish musical comedy film directed by León Klimovsky and starring the Dúo Dinámico. While travelling on a ship to Brazil the duo get no further than Tenerife, where they are left during a stopover.

Cast
 Ramón Arcusa as Himself 
 Manuel de la Calva as Himself  
 Ethel Rojo 
 Elena María Tejeiro 
 Trini Alonso 
 Chicho Gordillo 
 José María Caffarel 
 José Miguel Ariza 
 Pedro Rodríguez de Quevedo 
 Lili Muráti

References

Bibliography 
 Mira, Alberto. Historical Dictionary of Spanish Cinema. Scarecrow Press, 2010.

External links 
 

1964 films
1964 musical comedy films
Spanish musical comedy films
1960s Spanish-language films
Films directed by León Klimovsky
Films set in Spain
Seafaring films
1960s Spanish films